Judgement Day is a 2013 Singaporean comedy-drama disaster film written and directed by Ong Kuo Sin and produced by Mark Lee. Starring an ensemble cast, the film follows various characters from different backgrounds confessing to their wrongdoings and revealing their biggest secrets just 72 hours from what is believed to be "Judgement Day". It was released on April 18, 2013. Judgement Day marks John Cheng's final feature film role before his death on January 21, 2013.

Plot
With about 72 hours left to spend before "Judgement Day" supposedly arrives, various individuals start spilling out their greatest secrets.

Cast
 Mark Lee as a police officer.
 Henry Thia as Liu Fu An, a man who decides to change his gender.
 Chua En Lai as Richard
 Rebecca Lim as Rebecca, Richard's girlfriend
 Guo Liang
 Edwin Goh
 Julie Tan as Xiao Lu, a prostitute with AIDS
 Lawrence Wong as Ah Song
 Sebestian Tan as a car salesman.
 Tender Huang as Taiwanese man
 Ko Chia-yen as Li Shuzhen
 John Cheng as medium Uncle Jiu.
 Adrian Pang as Prime Minister Dr Ang

Release
The original release date in Singapore was put forth as "May 2013" in an earlier teaser poster; this has since been changed to April 18, 2013.

Summary
The film opens with a news report broadcast to Singapore that scientists have discovered a meteorite heading straight for earth and that there was only 72 hours left to live. Upon hearing this, Henry Thia's character tells his family that his last death wish was to become a woman, so he goes for MTF surgery to do this. We then follow the story of how his children are ridiculed in school for having two "mothers". In the end of the 72 hours, we are shown a scene of people at their HDB corridors looking out at the sky, bracing for impact. The meteorite whirls down from space; however, the meteorite burns out into a small stone which hits a boy squarely in the forehead for comedic effect. The people rejoice; however, scientists break the mood and report that another meteorite, which was ten times larger and sure to destroy earth, was coming. The film ends.

References

External links
 

2013 films
Singaporean comedy-drama films
Apocalyptic films